There are a number of major football rivalries in Argentina.

Superderby 

The superderby (superclásico) is the most important football rivalry in Argentina, and the most important local derby. It is contested between Buenos Aires rivals River Plate and Boca Juniors. It name in Spanish derives from the usage of clásico to mean derby and the prefix súper to denote its importance, because Boca Juniors and River Plate are the two most popular and successful teams in Argentine football, commanding more than 70% of all Argentine football fans between them.

Rivalry began due to the location of both clubs in the same neighborhood (La Boca, where were founded River Plate in 1901 and Boca Juniors in 1905) in the early 20th century (except for 1914 and 1915, when Boca Juniors moved its field to Wilde, a city of the Greater Buenos Aires, and then returned to its neighborhood), before River Plate left definitively the southern neighborhood in 1923 to move to the north of the city.
The superderby is known worldwide as one of world football's fiercest and most important derbies. It isn't particularly noted for the passion of the fans compared to the other important Argentine derbies due to their habituation to won trophies, but is the most followed in the country, and sometimes riots occurred. The English newspaper The Observer put the superderby at the top of their list of 50 sporting things you must do before you die.

Avellaneda derby 

The Avellaneda derby (clásico de Avellaneda), contested between Independiente and Racing, is the second most important rivalry in Argentine football. Both teams are from the city of Avellaneda (that is located into the Greater Buenos Aires) but have many fans throughout the country, being the third (Independiente) and fourth (Racing) most popular clubs in Argentina, accounting for more than 9% of the nation's population. They are also the third and fourth most successful Argentine teams respectively in terms of total number of honours won.
 
Rivalry started in the first decade of the 20th century, when Independiente, that was founded in 1904 (but officially in 1905) in the neighboring city of Buenos Aires, moved to Avellaneda (named Barracas al Sud until 1904) in 1907, the same year of the first match  against Racing (founded in Avellaneda in 1903), played on June 9 for the 3rd division and ended 3-2 in favor of Independiente. Since 1928 both stadiums are just 200 meters apart (Independiente's previous fields in Avellaneda were in other locations of the city). This derby is one of the most intense and colorful in the world, and didn't have a clear dominator until 1970s, when Independiente began to gain an advantage that is currently very large.

Rosario derby 

The Rosario derby (clásico rosarino) is the most important derby between clubs that are not based in the autonomous city or the province of Buenos Aires. It is contested between Newell's Old Boys and Rosario Central, the two major teams in the city of Rosario. The teams nicknames relate from the same incident where Rosario Central refused to play a charity game for a Leper colony, hence their nickname Canallas (Scoundrels). Newell's Old Boys stepped in to play the game and earned the nickname Los Leprosos (The Lepers).

Huracán - San Lorenzo de Almagro 
This derby, that doesn't have a name of its own (although sometimes is denominated as "neighborhood's derby" or "porteño derby", this denominations never became popular), is contested between Huracán and San Lorenzo de Almagro, both clubs from Buenos Aires (being the second most important derby of the city). While San Lorenzo de Almagro is the fifth most popular and successful team in Argentine football (and part of the big five), with fans all over the country, Huracán was considered a big team in the amateur era (professional era started in 1931) and since then is considered like a "mid-sized" team, occupying the 10th place in number of honours won (also remaining most part of its history in 1st division) and having the majority of its fans in Buenos Aires and some cities of the Greater Buenos Aires (mainly Valentín Alsina, Lanús, Piñeiro and Gerli) that are near the south of Argentine capital.

Rivalry began due to the proximity of both clubs, that since early 20th century to 1979 had their different fields in boundary neighborhoods of the south of Buenos Aires. San Lorenzo de Almagro was founded on April 1, 1908 in Almagro neighborhood, but quickly moved to another location (also in Almagro) that later became a part of Boedo (recognized as an official neighborhood of Buenos Aires in 1972, but the area was informally denominated with this name since late 19th century). Huracán was founded on November 1, 1908 in Nueva Pompeya, and later moved to Parque Patricios, both neighborhoods that borders Boedo (and each other). From 1916 (year of inauguration of San Lorenzo de Almagro's old stadium, the Gasómetro) to 1923, stadiums of both clubs were only 500 meters apart, then Huracán (that had its stadium in this place since 1914) built a new stadium in another location of the same neighborhood due to the expropriation of its ground by the government for open a street. In 1979, Argentine dictatorial government expropriated the ground where San Lorenzo de Almagro had its stadium (which was then demolished) and later sold it to a private company that opened a hypermarket (that was closed in 2019 due to the negotiations of the team for recover this ground). The club maintained its headquarters (that were next to the stadium) in the same place, where also are installations for another sports practiced by the club (basketball, volleyball, etc.). During the 1980s and early 1990s, San Lorenzo de Almagro played its home matches in several stadiums of Buenos Aires (including Huracán's stadium) and the Greater Buenos Aires until began to build a new stadium (Pedro Bidegain stadium, known as Nuevo Gasómetro) in the 1990s, that was inaugurated on December 16, 1993, in Flores neighborhood (also in the south of Buenos Aires, 3 kilometers away from the old stadium). The derby has been dominated historically by San Lorenzo de Almagro.

Western derby 
The Western derby (clásico del oeste) is contested between the two major teams in the west of the city of Buenos Aires, Ferro Carril Oeste and Vélez Sársfield. The first game was played in the amateur era in 1920 but this derby has not been played in official competition since Ferro's relegation from the Primera División in 2000. From the beginning of the professional era the difference between wins of Ferro Carril Oeste and Vélez Sarsfield has been 9 wins for the latter. This is one of the oldest derbies and rivalry began 11 years before the start of the professional AFA football league.

La Plata derby 

The La Plata derby (clásico platense) is contested between the two major clubs in the city of La Plata, Estudiantes de La Plata and Gimnasia y Esgrima La Plata. The derby is fiercely contested, and the rivalry between the fans is so extreme that Gimnasia y Esgrima La Plata fans have been accused of making death threats to their own team to lose on purpose to Boca Juniors during the 2006 Apertura; by strengthening Boca Juniors' lead at the top of the table, it would have damage Estudiantes' chances of winning the championship.

Cordoba derby 

The Córdoba derby (clásico cordobés) is a closely contested derby between the two most popular teams of Córdoba, Belgrano and Talleres. The teams nicknames are "Matadores" for Talleres and "Piratas" for Belgrano.

Santa Fe derby 

The Santa Fe derby (clásico santafesino) is contested between the two major teams in the city of Santa Fe, Colón and Unión. The derby had been played in official competition since 1913. Colón play their home games at the Estadio Brigadier López, while Unión play their home games at Estadio 15 de Abril. The teams nicknames are Sabaleros for Colón and Tatengues for Unión.

Tucumán derby 
The Tucumán derby (clásico tucumano): is contested between the two major teams in the province of Tucumán, and it is played in San Miguel de Tucumán, San Martín de Tucumán  vs. Club Atlético Tucumán, it is the most important match in northern  Argentina.

Complete list

Buenos Aires (city) 
 All Boys vs. Nueva Chicago
 Barracas  vs Barracas Central
 Boca Juniors vs. River Plate - Superderby
 Defensores de Belgrano vs. Excursionistas
 Huracán vs. San Lorenzo de Almagro
 Ferro Carril Oeste vs. Vélez Sarsfield - Western derby
 General Lamadrid vs. Comunicaciones
 Riestra vs. Sacachispas

Buenos Aires (city)/Buenos Aires Province 
 Buenos Aires/Loma Hermosa: General Lamadrid vs. Justo José de Urquiza
 Buenos Aires/Ciudad Evita: Español vs. Italiano - Derby of collectivities
 Buenos Aires/San Martín: Atlanta vs. Chacarita Juniors
 Buenos Aires/Tapiales: Yupanqui vs. Lugano

Buenos Aires Province 
 Adolfo Gonzales Chaves: Huracán Ciclista vs. Independencia - Chavense derby
 Adrogué/Burzaco: Brown (Adrogué) vs. San Martín (Burzaco)
 América: Independiente (América) vs. Rivadavia (América)
 Arrecifes: Almirante Brown (Arrecifes) vs. Huracán (Arrecifes)
 Avellaneda: Dock Sud vs. San Telmo
 Avellaneda: Independiente vs. Racing - Avellaneda derby
 Azul: Alumni Azuleño vs. Azul Athletic
 Banfield/Lanús: Banfield vs. Lanús - Clásico del Sur
 Banfield/Lomas de Zamora: Banfield vs. Los Andes
 Bahía Blanca: Bella Vista (BB)  vs. Tiro Federal (BB)
 Bahía Blanca: Villa Mitre vs. Olimpo - Bahía Blanca derby
 Boulogne/Villa Ballester: Acassuso vs. Central Ballester
 Caseros/Ciudadela: Almagro vs. Estudiantes - Tres de Febrero derby
 Chacabuco: Argentino (Chacabuco) vs. Nueve de Julio (Chacabuco) - Chacabuco derby
 Chivilcoy: Colón vs. Varela - Chivilcoy Derby
 Coronel Dorrego: Ferroviario vs. Independiente (Coronel Dorrego) - Dorreguense derby
 Daireaux: Bancario vs. Bull Dog - Deroense derby
 Ensenada/Berisso: Defensores de Cambaceres vs. Villa San Carlos - Riverside derby
 General Juan Madariaga: El León vs. Juventud Unida (Madariaga) - Madariaguense derby

General Pinto: General Pinto vs. Pintense
 General Villegas : Atlético vs. Eclipse 
Henderson: Fútbol Club Henderson vs. Juventud Unida (Henderson) - Hendersonense derby
 Ingeniero White: Huracán (Ineniero White) vs. Puerto Comercial - Whitense derby
 Isidro Casanova/Morón: Almirante Brown vs. Morón - West Zone derby
 Jáuregui/Luján: Flandria vs. Luján
 Junín: Ambos Mundos vs. Independiente (Junín)
 Junín: Defensa Argentina vs. River Plate (Junín)
 Junín: Mariano Moreno vs. Sarmiento (Junín)
 Junín: Rivadavia (Junín) vs. Villa Belgrano - Barrio Belgrano derby
 Lanús/Remedios de Escalada: Lanús vs. Talleres (Remedios de Escalada)
 La Plata: Estudiantes de La Plata vs. Gimnasia y Esgrima La Plata - Platense derby
 Libertad/Ituzaingó: Ferrocarril Midland vs. Ituzaingó
 Lincoln: El Linqueño vs. Rivadavia (Lincoln) - Lincoln derby
 Mar del Plata: Aldosivi vs. Alvarado
 Mar del Plata/Estacion Camet: Alvarado vs. Cadetes de San Martín
 Mar del Plata: Aldosivi vs. Talleres (Mar del Plata) - Port derby
 Mar del Plata: General Mitre vs. Mar del Plata
 Mar del Plata: Independiente (Mar del Plata) vs. Quilmes (Mar del Plata) (Oldest city's derby)
 Mar del Plata: Kimberley vs. San Lorenzo
 Merlo/Parque San Martín: Argentino (Merlo) vs. Merlo
 Mones Cazón: Independiente (Mones Cazón) vs. Mones Cazón - Mones Cazón derby
 Monte Hermoso: Monte Hermoso vs. Suterhy - Montehermoseño derby
 Olavarría: Estudiantes (Olavarría) vs. Racing (Olavarría)
 Pellegrini: Huracán (Pellegrini) vs. Pellegrini - Pellegrinense derby
 Pergamino: Argentino (Pergamino) vs. Gimnasia y Esgrima (Pergamino)
 Pergamino: Douglas Haig vs. Tráfico's Old Boys - Barrio Acevedo derby
 Pergamino: Provincial vs. Sports Pergamino - Barrio La Amalia derby
 Pigüé: Peñarol (Pigüé) vs. Sarmiento (Pigüé) - Clásico pigüense
 Pinamar: Pinamar vs. San Vicente (Pinamar) - Pinamarense derby
 Puan: Puan vs. Tiro Federal (Puan) - Puanense derby
 Punta Alta: Rosario Puerto Belgrano vs. Sporting (Punta Alta) - Puntaltense derby
 Quilmes: Argentino de Quilmes vs. Quilmes - Quilmeño derby
 San Carlos de Bolívar: Empleados de Comercio vs. Independiente (Bolívar) - Bolivarense derby
 San Miguel: Juventud Unida (San Miguel) vs. Muñiz
 San Miguel del Monte: Independiente (Monte) vs. San Miguel (Monte) - Montense derby
 Santa Teresita: Defensores Unidos (Santa Teresita) vs. Santa Teresita - Santa Teresita derby
 Sarandí/Gerli: Arsenal (Sarandí) vs. El Porvenir
 Tandil: Independiente (Tandil) vs. Ramón Santamarina
 Temperley/Lomas de Zamora: Temperley vs. Los Andes
 Tornquist: Automoto vs. Unión (Tornquist) - Tornquist derby
 Tres Arroyos: El Nacional (Tres Arroyos) vs. Huracán (Tres Arroyos)
 Vicente López/Victoria: Platense vs. Tigre - North Zone derby
 Villa Gesell: Atlético Villa Gesell vs. San Lorenzo (Villa Gesell) - Geselino derby
 Zárate/Campana: Defensores Unidos vs. Villa Dálmine

Catamarca Province 
San Fernando del Valle de Catamarca: San Lorenzo de Alem vs. Villa Cubas (Catamarqueño derby)
San Fernando del Valle de Catamarca: Chacarita vs. Parque Daza (Cuartel V derby)
San Fernando del Valle de Catamarca: Estudiantes de La Tablada vs. Policial (La Tablada derby)

Chaco Province 
Resistencia: Chaco For Ever vs. Sarmiento (Chaqueño derby)
Resistencia: Estudiantes de Resistencia vs. San Fernando (East derby)
Resistencia: Central Norte Argentino vs. Regional (Derby of the tracks)
Resistencia: Centauro vs. Nacional José María Paz (Derby of the colleges)
Resistencia: Universidad del Nordeste vs. Universidad Tecnológica Nacional (University derby)
Puerto Vilelas/Barranqueras: Defensores de Vilelas vs. Don Orione (Portuary derby)
Puerto Tirol: Independiente de Tirol vs. Juventud de Tirol (Puerto Tirol derby)
Villa Ángela: Alvear vs. Unión Progresista (Villa Ángela derby)
Presidencia Roque Sáenz Peña: Aprendices Chaqueños vs. Sportivo de Presidencia Roque Sáenz Peña (Saenzpeñense derby)
Concepción del Bermejo: Banfield de Concepción del Bermejo vs. Central Norte de Concepción del Bermejo (Concepción del Bermejo derby)

Chubut Province 
Puerto Madryn: Guillermo Brown vs. Madryn (Puerto Madryn derby)
Trelew: Independiente de Trelew vs. Racing de Trelew (Trelewense derby)
Comodoro Rivadavia: Huracán de Comodoro Rivadavia vs. Jorge Newbery de Comodoro Rivadavia (Comodorense derby)

Córdoba Province 
Adelia María: Club Atlético Adelia María vs. Club Deportivo Municipal Adelia Maria
Adelia María/San Basilio: Club Atlético Adelia María vs. Club Atlético San Basilio
Alcira Gigena:  Club Sportivo y Biblioteca Doctor Lautaro Roncedo vs. Club Atlético Lutgardis Riveros Gigena - Clásico gigenense
Alejo Ledesma: Club Atlético y Biblioteca Sarmiento vs. Club Atlético Los Andes (Ledesmense derby)
Alicia: Club Atlético y Filodramático Alicia vs. Fortín Sport Club (Aliceño derby)
Almafuerte: Club Atlético Almafuerte vs. Club Sportivo Belgrano (Almafuertense derby)
Arias: Arias Football Club vs. Belgrano Juniors Club Atlético y Biblioteca Popular (Ariense derby)
Arroyito: Club Deportivo y Cultural Arroyito vs. Club Sportivo 24 de Septiembre
Arroyo Cabral: Sport Club Colón vs. Club Atlético y Biblioteca Rivadavia (Cabralense derby)
Bell Ville: Club Atlético Argentino vs. Club Atlético y Biblioteca Bell
Bell Ville: Club Atletico Central vs. Club Atlético y Biblioteca River Plate 
Brinkmann: Club Centro Social Brinkmann vs. Club Atlético y Cultural San Jorge (Brinkmanense derby)
Camilo Aldao: Asociación Mutual Defensores Boca Juniors S.C.D. vs. Juventud Unida Mutual Social y Deportiva
Córdoba: Belgrano vs. Talleres (Cordoban derby)
Córdoba: Instituto vs. Racing de Córdoba
Córdoba: Las Flores vs. San Lorenzo de Córdoba
Córdoba: Avellaneda vs. Escuela Presidente Roca
Córdoba: Club Atlético Las Palmas vs. Universitario de Córdoba
Córdoba: Argentino Peñarol vs. Huracán de Córdoba
Canals: Club Atlético Canalense vs. Club Atlético Libertad
Corral de Bustos: Club Atlético Social Corralense vs. Corral de Bustos Sporting Club
General Cabrera: Club Sportivo Belgrano vs. Asociación Independiente Dolores
General Levalle: Club Atletico Estudiantes vs. Deportivo Club Independencia (Levallense derby)
Hernando: Club Atlético Estudiantes vs. Club Atlético Independiente (Hernandense derby)
La Carlota: Club Atlético y Biblioteca Central Argentino vs. Asociación Española Jorge R. Ross
La Palestina/Ticino: Club Atlético y Biblioteca Popular Ricardo Gutiérrez vs. Club Atlético Ticino
Las Varillas: Club Almafuerte vs. Club Atlético Huracán (Varillense derby)
Leones: Club Deportivo Atlético Social y Biblioteca Leones vs. Club Atlético Aeronáutico Mutual y Biblioteca Sarmiento
Leones/Marcos Juárez: Club Atlético Biblioteca y Mutual Argentino vs. Club Atlético Aeronáutico Mutual y Biblioteca Sarmiento
Morrison: Club Sportivo Huracán vs. Club Unión
Morteros: Asociación Deportiva 9 de Julio vs. Club Tiro Federal y Deportivo Morteros (Morterense derby)
Monte Buey: Club Matienzo Mutual, Social y Deportivo vs. Club Atlético San Martín
Noetinger: Club Atlético Mutual y Biblioteca Progreso vs. Asociación Mutual San Carlos Deportivo y Biblioteca
Río Cuarto: Club Sportivo y Biblioteca Atenas vs. Asociación Atlética Estudiantes (Riocuartense derby)
Sampacho: Club Recreativo Confraternidad vs. Club Atlético Sampacho
Santa Rosa de Río Primero: Asociación Mutual Club Ateneo Juvenil Acción vs. Mutual Club Atlético Santa Rosa
Ucacha: Club Jorge Newbery M.S.D. vs Club Atlético Atenas (Ucachense derby)
Vicuña Mackenna: Club Atlético Belgrano vs. Club Atlético San Martín
Villa Carlos Paz: Club Atlético Carlos Paz vs. Club Atlético Independiente
Villa María/Villa Nueva: Club Atletico Alumni vs. Foot Ball Club y Biblioteca Leandro N. Alem

Corrientes Province 
Corrientes: Corrientes vs. Libertad de Corrientes
Esquina: Esquina vs. Esquinense (Esquinense derby)
Curuzú Cuatiá: General Belgrano vs. Huracán de Curuzú Cuatiá
Curuzú Cuatiá: Barracas de Curuzú Cuatiá vs. Victoria
Paso de los Libres: Barraca vs. Guaraní de Paso de los Libres

Entre Ríos Province 
Paraná: Belgrano de Paraná vs. Paraná
Paraná: Peñarol de Paraná vs. Sportivo Urquiza
Paraná: Instituto de Paraná vs. Universitario Paraná
Concepción del Uruguay: Atlético Uruguay vs. Gimnasia y Esgrima de Concepción del Uruguay (Uruguayense derby)
Concepción del Uruguay: Almagro de Concepción del Uruguay vs. Parque Sur
Gualeguaychú: Central Entrerriano vs. Juventud Unida (Gualeguaychú derby)
Gualeguaychú: Pueblo Nuevo vs. Unión del Suburbio
Gualeguaychú: Defensores del Oeste vs. Sarmiento de Gualeguaychú
Gualeguaychú: La Vencedora vs. Sporting de Gualeguaychú
Viale: Arsenal de Viale vs. Viale (Vialense derby)
Crespo: Cultural de Crespo vs. Sarmiento de Crespo (Crespense derby)
Seguí: Cañadita Central vs. Seguí (Seguiense derby)
Villa Hernandarias: Hernandarias vs. Independiente de Villa Hernandarias (Villa Hernandarias derby)
Hasenkamp: Hasenkamp vs. Juventud Sarmiento (Hasenkampense derby)
Urdinarrain: Juventud Urdinarrain vs. Urdinarrain (Urdinarrain derby)
Colón: Defensores de Colón vs. Sauce
Colón: Campito vs. Ñapindá

Formosa Province 
Formosa: Chacra Ocho vs. Sol de América de Formosa (Formoseño derby)
Formosa: Fontana vs. Sportivo Patria

Jujuy Province 
San Salvador de Jujuy/Libertador General San Martín: Gimnasia y Egrima de Jujuy vs. Atletico Ledesma (Jujeño derby)
San Salvador de Jujuy: Cuyaya vs. General Lavalle
San Salvador de Jujuy: El Chañi vs. El Cruce
San Pedro: San Pedro vs. Tiro y Gimnasia (Sanpedreño derby)
Calilegua: Mitre de Calilegua vs. Unión Calilegua
Libertador General San Martín: Ingeniero Herminio Arrieta vs. San Francisco Bancario
Monterrico: Defensores de Monterrico vs. Monterrico San Vicente (Monterrico derby)
El Carmen: El Carmen vs. Rivadavia de El Carmen
La Quiaca: Argentino de La Quiaca vs. Libertad de La Quiaca

La Rioja Province 
La Rioja: Andino vs. Defensores de La Boca
La Rioja: Américo Tesoreri vs. Rioja Juniors
La Rioja: Independiente de La Rioja vs. Riojano
Chilecito: Defensores de La Plata vs. Estrella Roja

La Pampa Province 
Santa Rosa: All Boys de Santa Rosa vs. Club Atlético Santa Rosa (Santarroceño derby)
Victorica, La Pampa: Club Social y Deportivo Cochicó vs. Deportivo Telén (Derby of the West)
Jacinto Aráuz: Independiente de Jacinto Aráuz vs. Villa Mengelle (Jacinto Aráuz derby)
Guatraché: Huracán de Guatraché vs. Pampero (Guatrachense derby)

Mendoza Province 
Mendoza: Gimnasia y Esgrima vs. Independiente Rivadavia (Mendozan derby)
Godoy Cruz: Andes Talleres vs. Godoy Cruz Antonio Tomba (Godoycruceño derby)
Palmira/San Martín: Palmira vs. San Martín de Mendoza
Las Heras: Algarrobal vs. Huracán Las Heras (Lasheriño derby)
Guaymallén: Argentino de Mendoza vs. Guaymallén
General Gutiérrez/Maipú: Gutiérrez vs. Maipú
Fray Luis Beltrán/Rodeo del Medio: Fray Luis Beltrán vs. Rodeo del Medio
San Rafael: Huracán de San Rafael vs. Pedal
San Rafael: El Porvenir de San Rafael vs. Quiroga
San Rafael: Constitución vs. San Luis de San Rafael
La Consulta: El Fortín de La Consulta vs. La Consulta
Colonia Las Rosas/Los Sauces: Fernández Álvarez vs. Independiente Las Rosas

Misiones Province 
Posadas: Bartolomé Mitre de Posadas vs. Guaraní Antonio Franco (Posadeño derby)
Posadas: Jorge Gibson Brown vs. Posadas
Oberá: Oberá vs. Olimpia de Oberá (Obereño derby)
Puerto Iguazú: Tacuarí vs. Villa Nueva
Puerto Iguazú: Central Iguazú vs. Galaxia
Jardín América: El Timbó vs. Jardín América (Jardinense derby)
Santo Pipó: Santo Pipó Sporting vs. Tigre de Santo Pipó (Piposeño derby)
Garuhapé: Garuhapé vs. Mandiyú de Garuhapé (Garuhapé derby)

Neuquén Province 
Neuquén: Independiente de Neuquén vs. Pacífico de Neuquén
Neuquén: Maronese vs. San Lorenzo de Neuquén
Zapala: Barrio Don Bosco vs. Unión de Don Bosco (Zapalian derby)

Río Negro Province 
Cipolletti: Cipolletti vs. San Martín de Cipolletti
Cipolletti: Pillmatún vs. San Pablo de Cipolletti
Villa Regina: Italiano de Villa Regina vs. Regina (Reginense derby)
San Carlos de Bariloche: Estudiantes Unidos vs. Independiente de Bariloche (Barilochense derby)
Allen: Alto Valle vs. Unión Alem Progresista (Allense derby)
General Roca: Argentinos del Norte vs. General Roca (Roquense derby)

Salta Province 
Salta: Juventud Antoniana vs. Central Norte
Salta: Mitre de Salta vs. Villa San Antonio

San Juan Province 
Santa Lucía/San Juan: Juventud Alianza vs. San Martín de San Juan
Rivadavia: Desamparados: vs. Juan Bautista Del Bono
Rawson/Villa Krause: Trinidad vs. Unión de Villa Krause

San Luis Province 
San Luis: Estudiantes de San Luis vs. Juventud Unida Universitario (Puntano derby)

Santa Cruz Province 
Puerto Deseado: Deseado Juniors vs. Ferrocarriles del Estado (Deseadense derby)
Puerto San Julián: Independiente de Puerto San Julián vs. Racing de Puerto San Julián (Puerto San Julián derby)

Santa Fe Province 
Rosario: Newell's Old Boys vs. Rosario Central (Rosarian derby)
Rosario: Argentino de Rosario vs. Central Córdoba
Santa Fe: Colón  vs. Unión (Santa Fe derby)
Rafaela: Atlético de Rafaela vs. Nueve de Julio (Rafaelian derby)
Rafaela: Argentino Quilmes vs. Peñarol de Rafaela
Santo Tomé: Atenas de Santo Tomé vs. Independiente de Santo Tomé (Santotomesino derby)
Sunchales: Libertad de Sunchales vs. Unión de Sunchales (Sunchalian derby)
San Justo: Colón de San Justo vs. Sanjustino (Sanjustino derby)
Empalme Villa Constitución: Empalme vs. Empalme Central (Empalmense derby)
Fighiera: Figherense vs. Central Argentino de Fighiera
Arroyo Seco: Arroyo Seco vs. Unión de Arroyo Seco (Arroyense derby)
Firmat: Argentino de Firmat vs. Firmat (Firmatense derby)
Casilda: Alumni de Casilda vs. Aprendices Casildenses
Chabás: Chabás vs. Huracán de Chabás (Chabasense derby)
Carcarañá: Campaña vs. Carcarañá (Carcarañense derby)
Las Parejas: Argentino de Las Parejas vs. Sportivo (Parejense derby)
Reconquista: Adelante vs. Platense Porvenir
Reconquista: Nueva Chicago de Reconquista vs. Racing de Reconquista
San Vicente: Brown vs. Bochazo (Sanvicentino derby)
Totoras: Totoras Juniors vs. Unión Fútbol Club (Totorense derby)
María Juana: María Juana vs. Talleres de María Juana (Mariajuanense derby)
Humboldt: Juventud Unida de Humboldt vs. Sarmiento de Humboldt (Humboldt derby)
San Carlos Centro: Argentino de San Carlos Centro vs. Central San Carlos (Sancarlino derby)
Felicia: Felicia vs. Juventud Unida de Felicia
Esperanza: Juventud de Esperanza vs. Sportivo del Norte (North neighborhood derby)

Santiago del Estero Province 
Santiago del Estero: Central Córdoba de Santiago del Estero vs. Mitre (Santiagueño derby)
Santiago del Estero: Comercio Central Unidos vs. Estudiantes de Santiago del Estero
La Banda: Central Argentino de La Banda vs. Sarmiento de La Banda (Bandeño derby)
Loreto: Loreto vs. Unión Obrera (Loretano derby)

Tucumán Province 
San Miguel de Tucumán: San Martín  vs. Tucumán (Tucumanian derby)
San Miguel de Tucumán: Amalia vs. Tucumán Central
Aguilares: Aguilares vs. Jorge Newbery (Aguilares derby)
Santa Ana: San Lorenzo de Santa Ana vs. Santa Ana (Santa Ana derby)
Bella Vista/La Encantada: Bella Vista vs. San Fernando de La Encantada
Tafí Viejo: Juventud Unida de Tafí Viejo vs. Talleres de Tafí Viejo (Taficeño derby)

References 

 *